StemCells, Inc. is a public biopharmaceutical company headquartered in Newark, California, that is developing purified human neural stem cells (HuCNS-SCs) in the hopes of treating central nervous system disorders and paralysis. StemCells' HuCNS-SCs have the ability to differentiate into the three main types of cells found in the central nervous system: neurons, astrocytes and oligodendrocytes.

They are being studied in early stage trials.

In March 2020, Microbot Medical Inc. announced the appointment of Eyal Morag, M.D. to Chief Medical Officer.

References

External links 
 StemCells, Inc. website

Biotechnology companies of the United States